Rubicon Peak is a mountain in the Sierra Nevada mountain range to the west of Lake Tahoe in the Desolation Wilderness in El Dorado County, California.

References

External links 
 

Mountains of the Desolation Wilderness
Mountains of El Dorado County, California
Mountains of Northern California